Semiclivina dentipes is a species of ground beetle in the family Carabidae, found in North America.

References

Further reading

External links

 

dentipes
Articles created by Qbugbot
Beetles described in 1825